The 1921 Massawa earthquake took place off the coast of Massawa, Eritrea, on August 14 with a moment magnitude of 6.1 and a Mercalli intensity of VIII (Severe). The first aftershock after the initial earthquake was of similar magnitude. Significant damage was caused to the harbour at Massawa with a number of deaths reported. Aftershocks were felt as far away as Asmara and Dekemhare.

See also
 List of earthquakes in Eritrea

References

Massawa
1921 Massawa
Earthquakes in the 20th century
History of the Red Sea
1921 disasters in Africa